WQIL (101.3 FM) is a radio station broadcasting a top 40/CHR format. Licensed to Chauncey, Georgia, United States, the station is currently owned by GSW, Inc.

On September 9, 2016, WQIL changed their format from contemporary Christian (branded as "Faith FM") to adult hits, branded as "Smash Hits 101.3", catering to Smash Hits from the 80s and 90s.

On November 16, 2017, WQIL changed their format from adult hits to top 40/CHR, branded as "Q101.3".

It appears that at midnight March 3, 2023, they have changed to The Buzz which plays eighties music.

Previous logo

References

External links

QIL
Contemporary hit radio stations in the United States